John Joseph "Jack" Valiquette (born March 18, 1954) is a Canadian retired ice hockey forward.

Valiquette was born in Aylmer, Ontario. He started his National Hockey League career with the Toronto Maple Leafs in 1974. He also played for the Colorado Rockies. He retired after the 1980-81 season, after a seven-year career.

Career statistics

External links 

1956 births
Living people
Canadian ice hockey centres
Colorado Rockies (NHL) players
National Hockey League first-round draft picks
People from St. Thomas, Ontario
Sault Ste. Marie Greyhounds players
Toronto Maple Leafs draft picks
Toronto Maple Leafs players